Gerhard VI, Count of Oldenburg (1430 – 22 February 1500) was a Count of Oldenburg and regent of Bad Zwischenahn in 1440–1482.

Biography
Gerhard was the third son of Dietrich of Oldenburg and his wife, Helvig of Schauenburg. His eldest brother first succeeded their father and later was elected King Christian I of Denmark in 1448, therefore passing on the county to his brothers in 1450. From 1440 to 1463 Gerhard VI ruled in Delmenhorst as regent and from 1464 to 1482 (after the death of his brother Maurice) as the guardian of his nephew Jakob. He was constantly at war with Gerhard III, Prince-Archbishop of Bremen, and Frisians. In 1483 Gerhard was compelled to abdicate in favor of his sons, and he died whilst on a pilgrimage in the Rhône valley.

Family and children
In 1453 he married with Adelheid of Tecklenburg (c. 1435 – 2 March 1477), daughter of Otto VII, Count of Tecklenburg. They had eleven children:
 Gerhard of Oldenburg (1454–1470)
 Dietrich of Oldenburg (c. 1456 – 1463)
 Adolph, Count of Oldenburg-Delmenhorst (1458 – 17 February 1500)
 Christian of Oldenburg (1459 – 27 May 1492)
 John V, Count of Oldenburg (1460 – 10 February 1526)
 Otto of Oldenburg (d. 17 February 1500), a canon of Bremen Cathedral Chapter
 Elisabeth of Oldenburg (1468 – 12 September 1505)
 Anna of Oldenburg (1469 – 26 September 1505)
 Irmgard of Oldenburg; married Hero Oomkens von Esens, Earl of Harlingerland.
 Hedwig of Oldenburg (d. 22 February 1502); married in 1498 Edo Wimken II of Jever (1468 - 19 April 1511); had issue, including Maria of Jever.
 Adelheid of Oldenburg (d. 1513); married in 1503 Dietrich III of Plesse.

Ancestry

References

Other sources
Hartmut Platte (2006) as Haus Oldenburg (Börde-Verlag, Werl) 

1430 births
1500 deaths
Counts of Oldenburg